Francescuccio Ghissi, also called Francesco di Cecco Ghissi, (fl. 1359 – 1395) was an Italian painter. His exact date of birth and death are not known.

Ghissi was an exponent of the Gothic style, active especially in the Marche region of  central-eastern Italy. He is known to have worked with Allegretto Nuzi. He primarily painted religious works for church commissions, but little is known about his activities and works except that of the Madonna of Humility, part of a triptych he painted, which now resides as part of the Polesden Lacey National Trust collection. He also has works on display in the Pinacoteca Civica of Fabriano, and painted for the Cathedral of Fabriano. Other paintings are present in Ascoli Piceno (Church of Sant'Agostino), Montegiorgio (Church of Sant'Andrea), and the Pinacoteca of Fermo.

Ghissi also painted the St. John altarpiece, made up of nine different paintings. The center one depicts the Crucifixion, while the eight surrounding it depict stories from the life of St. John the Evangelist. This paintings were sawed apart and separated during the 19th or early 20th century to be sold, and have recently been reunited.

References

Further reading
 (see index; plates 24–26)

External links
 The "Primitive" Encyclopedie.bseditions.fr  
 Works of Francescuccio Ghissi on worldvisitguide.com

14th-century Italian painters
Italian male painters
Gothic painters
Year of birth unknown
Year of death unknown